Collaboration is an album by American jazz group the Modern Jazz Quartet with Brazilian guitarist Laurindo Almeida featuring performances recorded at Webster Hall in 1964 and released on the Atlantic label.

Reception
The Allmusic review stated "the music is very memorable".

Track listing
All compositions by John Lewis except as indicated
 "Silver" - 3:40   
 "Trieste" - 5:22   
 "Valeria" - 5:47   
 "Fugue in A Minor" (Johann Sebastian Bach) (BWV 947; this work is probably not actually by Bach)- 3:46   
 "One Note Samba" (Antonio Carlos Jobim, Newton Mendonça) - 5:06   
 "Foi A Saudade" (Djalma Ferreira) - 2:34   
 "Concierto de Aranjuez" (Joaquín Rodrigo) - 11:45

Personnel
Laurindo Almeida - guitar
Milt Jackson - vibraphone
John Lewis - piano
Percy Heath - bass
Connie Kay - drums

References

Atlantic Records albums
Laurindo Almeida albums
Modern Jazz Quartet albums
1964 albums
Albums produced by Nesuhi Ertegun